An emigrant is a person who has participated in emigration

The Emigrants or Emigrant may refer to:

The Emigrants (novel series), four novels by Swedish author Vilhelm Moberg:
The Emigrants (Moberg novel) (1949), (Swedish title: Utvandrarna)
Unto a Good Land (1952), (Swedish title: Invandrarna)
The Settlers (novel) (1956), (Swedish title: Nybyggarna)
The Last Letter Home (1959), (Swedish title: Sista brevet till Sverige)
The Emigrants (film), a 1971 film adaption by Jan Troell of Moberg's first two novels
The New Land, a sequel to the 1971 film
The Emigrants (Sebald novel), a 1993 novel by German author W.G. Sebald
The Emigrants, a novel by Norwegian author Johan Bojer Vor egen stamme  or The Emigrants (1924/English 1925)
The Emigrants, a poem by Charlotte Smith published in two volumes in 1793.
The Emigrants (Lamming novel), a 1954 novel by Barbadian author George Lamming
The Emigrants; or, The History of an Expatriated Family, a 1793 novel by American author Gilbert Imlay
The Emigrants (miniseries), a 1977 Australian miniseries
The Emigrant (1994 film), an Egyptian film by Youssef Chahine
The Emigrant (1940 film), a French comedy film
El emigrante (film), aka "The Emigrant" (film), a 1960 Spanish comedy film
Emigranti, (sr) aka "Emigrants", a 2002 Yugoslavian film
"Emigrant", the nom de plure of Yosif Gotman

Places 
 Emigrant, Montana
 Emigrant Peak
 Emigrant Lake (Oregon)
 Emigrant Pass (disambiguation), several mountain passes
 Emigrant Wilderness, a forest
 Emigrant Springs, Lincoln County, Wyoming
 Emigrant Springs Formation, Nevada
 Emigrant Springs State Heritage Area
 Emigrant Trails, see Westward Expansion Trails

Other 
 Catopsilia, butterflies known as "Emigrants"
 Emigrant Savings Bank, a bank
 Emigrant Church, Sletta, Norway

See also
 Emigrante (disambiguation)
 Immigrant (disambiguation)
 Migrant (disambiguation)
 Emigration